The Fort du Scex is a component of Fortress Saint-Maurice, which is in turn one of the three principal fortified regions of the National Redoubt of Switzerland. The Fort du Scex was built in the Scex cliff face immediately to the west of Saint-Maurice beginning in 1911. With the later Fort de Cindey, it comprises a fortress complex encased in rock high above the strategic Saint-Maurice valley. The fort lost its combat function in 1984 and was entirely deactivated in 1995.  It is now open for public tours during the summer months.

Description
Lateral branches to the interior of the mountain lead to troop accommodations, the command post, ammunition magazines and utility areas. Primarily an artillery position, the fort was planned to provide supporting fire to the larger and earlier forts Savatan and Dailly on the right bank of the Rhône. 

Scex is connected to the adjoining Fort de Cindey by a cut tunnel, 800m long which leads to the natural caves of the Grotte aux Fées. The Galerie du Scex was initially armed with four 75mm1903/18 L30 Krupp-Giovanola guns in 1911. The fort was also equipped with four machine gun positions, disposed in a projecting bay or caponier with two guns sweeping the cliff face in each direction. From 1915 the fort was expanded. The connection  to the Grotte aux Fées was built in 1935-36. The Ermitage battery of four 75mm 1903/22 L30 guns in individual casemates was constructed in 1938-39, with further improvements to habitation during and after World War II.

The artillery was deactivated in 1984, when the position was converted to use as a command post. All of the 75mm pieces were removed, although one was reconstructed in 2001 for display. By 1995 the fort was entirely deactivated. Routine access to the fort for supplies was provided by an aerial camouflaged cableway, built in 1922.

Influence
The Fort du Scex was the first example of a flanking battery built into a rock face in Switzerland. Scex was the prototype for similar emplacements in the Ticino canton and elsewhere in Switzerland.

Present status
The fort is available for public tours in summer months, together with the Fort de Cindey and the Grotte aux Fées.

References

External links
 Forts de Scex and Cindey
 Fort du Scx and Festung-Oberland.ch
 Festung Scex (in German, access from Schweiz menu)

Fortress Saint-Maurice
Cold War museums in Switzerland
World War II museums in Switzerland
Museums in Valais